Dzmitry Shershan (born December 28, 1988) is a Belarusian judoka. He competed at the 2016 Summer Olympics in the men's 66 kg event, in which he was eliminated in the second round by Rishod Sobirov.

References

External links
 
 
 
 

1988 births
Living people
Belarusian male judoka
Olympic judoka of Belarus
Judoka at the 2016 Summer Olympics
European Games competitors for Belarus
Judoka at the 2015 European Games
Judoka at the 2019 European Games
20th-century Belarusian people
21st-century Belarusian people